C43 is a secondary route in Namibia that begins in Bergsig, running for 457 kilometres to the Angolan-Namibian border where it terminates at Epupa Falls.

Major junctions are with the C41 at Opuwo, the C39at Khorixas, and the C40 at Palmwag.

References 

Roads in Namibia